The 2007 Women's European Water Polo Olympic Qualification Tournament for the Games of the XXIX Olympiad in Beijing 2008 was held in Kirishi, Russia from August 19 to August 26, 2007. The Netherlands defeated Russia in the final and so earned a berth for the 2008 Summer Olympics Water Polo Competition.

Preliminary round

Group A

August 21, 2007

August 22, 2007

August 23, 2007

Group B

August 19, 2007

August 20, 2007

August 21, 2007

August 22, 2007

August 23, 2007

Play-Offs
August 24, 2007 — 9th place

August 25, 2007 — 7th place

August 25, 2007 — 5th place

Semi finals
August 25, 2007

Finals
August 26, 2007 — 3rd place

August 26, 2007 — 1st place

Final ranking

Netherlands qualified for the 2008 Summer Olympics in Beijing, PR China; Teams placed from 6th up to 2nd will play in the 2008 FINA Olympic Qualification Tournament in Imperia, Italy

See also
2007 European Water Polo Olympic Qualification Tournament

References
 LEN Website

Olympic
W
W